is a Japanese footballer currently playing as a midfielder for Kagoshima United.

Club career
Ishitsu made his professional debut in a 0–6 Emperor's Cup loss against Avispa Fukuoka.

Career statistics

Club
.

Notes

References

External links

2002 births
Living people
Association football people from Ibaraki Prefecture
Japanese footballers
Association football midfielders
Kashima Antlers players
Kagoshima United FC players